Rudolf Kozłowski (born 15 July 1935) is a Polish weightlifter. He competed in the men's featherweight event at the 1964 Summer Olympics.

References

1935 births
Living people
Polish male weightlifters
Olympic weightlifters of Poland
Weightlifters at the 1964 Summer Olympics
Sportspeople from Zabrze
World Weightlifting Championships medalists
20th-century Polish people
21st-century Polish people